"Ingen sommar utan reggae" is a Swedish song by Markoolio written by Johan Fjellström, Joakim Hillson and Nicklas Ternedal. Taken from Markoolio's album Värsta plattan, the song was recorded in "The Living Room Studio" and was produced by Empire Music Production.

The single, a pop–reggae tune inspired by Bob Marley, released in April 2007 topped the Swedish Singles Chart for 5 weeks, staying in the Top 5 for 14 weeks and in the Top 60 for a total of 22 weeks. It has been certified double platinum in Sweden.

The single contains two tracks:
"Ingen sommar utan reggae" (3:48)
"Ingen sommar utan reggae" (instrumental) (3:48)

Although hugely popular with the young as well as older listeners, the song came under consistent criticism for its lyrics believed to glorify alcohol and encourage its consumption in great quantities (known as binging) with suggestive lyrics like "dricka hemkört och cola, i en uppblåsbar pool" (drinking moonshine and cola in an inflatable pool) and "första vita helgen, jag tror jag dör" (in my first white/sober weekend, I believe I'm going to die).

Charts

References

2007 singles
Swedish-language songs
Number-one singles in Sweden
Markoolio songs
2007 songs
Sony BMG singles
Reggae songs